This is a list of awards and nominations received by Norwegian DJ Alan Walker.

Awards

DJ Magazine Top 100 DJs

References

Walker, Alan
Awards